Archibald William Clayton Bayes (25 April 1896 – 1980) was an English football goalkeeper. He was born in Bedford and played for England at amateur level.

Bayes began his football career with Ilford who he joined after leaving the RAF. He left Ilford to join Torquay United while Torquay were still a non-league club. He remained at Plainmoor as Torquay progressed into the football league, but missed out on playing in Torquay's first ever game in the football league after an injury in training, Laurie Millsom taking his place.

He soon regained his place in the first team, making his league debut on 7 September 1927 in a 1–0 defeat at home to Millwall. He remained a regular until the end of that season, but played mainly as a reserve after the signing of former England international Harold Gough. He retired after making 55 football league appearances.

References

1896 births
1980 deaths
English footballers
Ilford F.C. players
Torquay United F.C. players
Sportspeople from Bedford
Association football goalkeepers
Footballers from Bedfordshire
Military personnel from Bedford
Royal Air Force personnel of World War I
Royal Air Force airmen